Joshua Beal Ferris (January 13, 1804 – June 8, 1886) was a member of the Connecticut House of Representatives representing Stamford from 1838 to 1839, and a member of the Connecticut Senate representing Connecticut's 12th Senate District from 1840 to 1842, and from 1849 to 1851. In 1851, he was Senate President Pro Tempore.

He graduated from Yale College in 1823, and thereafter opened a preparatory school in Stamford, where he taught until 1833.

He was admitted to the bar in 1829, and began practicing law in Fairfield County in 1833. At one point he was partners with Calvin G. Child.

In the election of 1848, Ferris was elected a presidential elector for the Whig Party. He cast his vote for Zachary Taylor and Millard Fillmore for President and Vice President of the United States.

References

External links 
 

1804 births
1886 deaths
Connecticut lawyers
Connecticut state senators
Connecticut Whigs
19th-century American politicians
Members of the Connecticut House of Representatives
People from Greenwich, Connecticut
Politicians from Stamford, Connecticut
Presidents pro tempore of the Connecticut Senate
1848 United States presidential electors
Yale College alumni
19th-century American lawyers